Dover Records was a British record label that was formed about 1989.

One of the recordings was a celebration of Arsenal winning the 1989 League Division One with "We're Back (Where We Belong)" single.

Recordings on the Dover label released compilations related to the magazine Smash Hits, starting with Smash Hits Party '89.

Dover was a subsidiary of Chrysalis Records and incorporated another Chrysalis offshoot, Flutterby Records. The change-over from Flutterby to Dover was so messy that a single by Steeleye Span, "Following Me," appeared on the Dover label under a Flutterby number - "FLUT 4". The label evidently disappeared in 1991.

External links
Hits on the Dover Label

Record labels established in 1989
British record labels
Rock record labels
Pop record labels